Rocky Vista University (RVU) is a private, for-profit medical school with campus locations in Parker, Colorado and Ivins, Utah. The school opened in 2006 as the only modern for-profit medical school in the United States although other for-profit schools have since opened. RVU's College of Osteopathic Medicine (RVUCOM) grants the Doctor of Osteopathic Medicine degree and admitted its inaugural class of medical students at the Parker, Colorado campus in August 2008.

History 
Rocky Vista University opened in 2006, and the first class was admitted in 2008. The school graduated its inaugural class on May 19, 2012. In 2017, a second campus was opened in Ivins, Utah, admitting its first class of osteopathic medical students in the fall of 2017. In September 2018, the first class of physician assistant students began coursework.

The college is fully accredited by the American Osteopathic Association Commission on Osteopathic College Accreditation, and regionally by the Higher Learning Commission.

Academics

Doctor of Osteopathic Medicine

RVUCOM offers the Doctor of Osteopathic Medicine (DO) degree, which follows a systems-based, four-year (eight-semester) curriculum. Years 1 and 2 of the program consist primarily of classroom-based learning, focusing on the basic health sciences. Years 3 and 4 of the curriculum consist of clinical clerkships (rotations) in major medical specialties. Clerkship sites for RVUCOM students include various hospitals and clinics in Colorado, Utah, Wyoming, Idaho, Arizona and South Dakota.

Physician Assistant
A Master of Physician Assistant Studies (MPAS) program is offered at the Parker, CO campus. The curriculum includes two semesters of classroom based didactics, followed by five semesters of clinical rotations. The program holds provisional accreditation status from the Accreditation Review Commission on Education for the Physician Assistant (ARC-PA).

Graduate studies
Rocky Vista University offers a nine-month (30 semester hour) graduate program on both campuses leading to the Master of Science in Biomedical Sciences (MSBS) degree. The program is designed for students looking to strengthen their competitiveness and academic background for admission to professional health programs.

For-profit status
RVUCOM is notable for being the first modern day, for-profit medical school operating in the United States. As such, its opening generated controversy. Critics raise concerns that a for-profit school will be beholden to investors, and lack credibility. Supporters say that the school is held to the same academic and accreditation standards as other medical schools.

Rocky Vista LLC was founded by Yife Tien and his wife Lucy Chua Tien, MD in 2006 and governed by a board of trustees. Castle Pines Holdings LLC was established as a holding company to control the Tiens' interest in Rocky Vista LLC and provide stability in the event of Tien's death or incapacity. In 2019, the ownership of Rocky Vista University was transferred to Medforth Global Healthcare Education, the owner-operator of St. George's University in Grenada.

Graduate medical education
Parkview Medical Center in Pueblo, Colorado, has been awarded a five-year $770,000 federal grant from the U.S. Health Resources and Services Administration (HRSA) to train primary care internal medicine residents. Parkview has developed a new osteopathic internal medicine residency program which matriculated its first trainees in July 2012. The grant was a joint effort of Parkview Medical Center and Rocky Vista University along with the Center for Medical Education Excellence (formerly known as Rocky Mountain OPTI). RVUCOM and the Center for Medical Education Excellence are currently working to establish additional residency programs in Colorado and Wyoming.

HealthONE/Sky Ridge Medical Center in Lone Tree, Colorado is also a participant in the Center for Medical Education Excellence, and is the site of an internal medicine residency program which collaborates with RVU.

Rocky Vista Health Center

RVUCOM owns and operates the health clinic, Rocky Vista Health Center (RVHC), located on the Parker, Colorado campus. The clinic is a primary care medical facility which provides continued health care and health maintenance for its patients. In addition to primary care, the clinic provides services in internal medicine, sports medicine, and osteopathic manipulation. The clinic employs board certified M.D. and D.O. physicians as well as resident physicians.

Advanced medical students of the college are periodically selected to work in the health clinic as “Osteopathic Manipulative Medicine (OMM) Fellows.” Under the supervision of board-certified physicians, these students provide osteopathic manipulation to patients at discounted rates. The clinic accepts Medicaid and Medicare patients to help the underserved in the Denver and Parker area.

See also
 List of medical schools in the United States
 Osteopathic medicine in the United States

References

External links
Official website

Medical schools in Colorado
Osteopathic medical schools in the United States
Parker, Colorado
For-profit universities and colleges in the United States
Private universities and colleges in Colorado
Educational institutions established in 2006
2006 establishments in Colorado
2017 establishments in Utah